Pterotosoma is a genus of moths in the family Uraniidae first described by Warren in 1903.

Species
Pterotosoma bilineata Warren, 1903
Pterotosoma castanea (Warren, 1898)

References

Uraniidae